Stanford House is a Grade II listed building on Castle Gate Nottingham.

History
The house was built for William Stanford, a merchant hosier, in 1775. The front facade contains a large fanlight above the main door framed with a bucrania frieze and fluted columns, with a venetian window above. The garden front contains a three-storey bay and may have formed part of the previous mansion on the site built by George Augustus, Viscount Howe of Langar Hall in 1755.

It was converted into offices in 1928 and was the offices of Robert Barber and Sons, solicitors. In 1990 it was put up for sale with an asking price of £500,000.

References

Grade II listed buildings in Nottinghamshire
Buildings and structures in Nottingham
Buildings and structures completed in 1775